The Worthys is a cluster of villages in the City of Winchester district of Hampshire, located north and north-east of the city itself.  
 Abbots Worthy
 Headbourne Worthy
 Kings Worthy
 Martyr Worthy

Governance 
Since 2016, three of the villages constitute The Worthys ward of Winchester City Council, with Martyr Worthy lying within the Alresford and Itchen Valley ward; both wards elects three councillors each, and are both within the Itchen Valley ward of Hampshire County Council.

Headbourne Worthy has its own Parish Council, whilst Abbots Worthy is part of the Kings Worthy Parish Council and Martyr Worthy is part of the Itchen Valley parish.

References

Villages in Hampshire